The Church of Santa María de Villanueva is a Romanesque-style, Roman Catholic parish church in the diocese of Villanueva, in the municipality of Teverga, community of Asturias, Spain.

While elements including the sculpted capitals of the internal column-pilasters flanking the nave date to prior to the 12th-century, the church has undergone subsequent refurbishments.

See also
 Monasterio de Santa María de Villanueva de Oscos

References

Maria de Villanueva
Romanesque architecture in Asturias
10th-century churches in Spain
Bien de Interés Cultural landmarks in Asturias